Flamingo Honey is an EP by Whirlwind Heat, released on August 24, 2004 by Dim Mak records. It consists of ten 1-minute songs, and was produced by Brendan Benson.

Track listing 
 The Bone
 The Meat Packers
 No Gums
 H is O
 A Worms Coat
 Muffler
 Flamingo Lawns
 Ice-Nine
 Pearl Earrings
 Lazy Morning

Flamingo Honey was released on CD and limited edition 10" vinyl. All 10 tracks are on the A-side, and the B-side is blank with unique engraved drawings and lyrics done by the band.

2004 EPs
Whirlwind Heat EPs